Lasioglossum imitatum is a species of sweat bee in the family Halictidae. It is known as the bristle sweat bee.

References

Further reading

 

imitatum
Insects described in 1853